Hamid Motebassem (Persian: حمید متبسم) (b. 1958 Mashhad) is a classical Persian musician and tar and setar player.

His first teacher was his father. Later, he studied with musicians like Mohammad Reza Lotfi, Hossein Alizadeh and Hushang Zarif. In 1991, Motebassem founded Dastan ensemble which is one of the outstanding ensembles of contemporary Persian music.

Works
Simorq (based on Ferdowsi's Shahnameh) for voice, choire and orchestre of Persian instruments
  Zemzeme-haa [Whispers], for voice and Persian instruments

References

1958 births
Living people
Iranian setar players
Iranian tar players
People from Mashhad
String musicians